The 2009 season is the 56th year in Guangzhou Football Club's existence, their 42nd season in the Chinese football league, also the 21st season in the top-flight, the second consecutive year. The club participated in the Chinese Super League. Although finished the ninth place of the league, Guangzhou Pharmaceutical relegated to China League One at the end of the season due to match fixing scandal.

Kits and sponsors
The team kits for the 2009 season are produced by Nike. The title sponsor is Baiyunshan Pharmaceutical Co., Ltd. and the shirt sponsors are Zhongyi Pharmaceutical Co., Ltd. (front) and Baiyunshan Hutchison Whampoa Co., Ltd. (back).

Technical staff

First-team squad

Transfers

In

Loan in

Out

Loan out

Match results

Friendly matches

Chinese Super League

League table

Squad stats
Updated to games played on 31 October 2009.To see the table ordered by certain column title click that column header icon  once or twice.

No appearances player not listed.

Youth teams

Reserves

U19s

For table see 2009 Chinese U–19 League table

References

External links
 Guangzhou Pharmaceutical F.C. official site 
 News, photos and match highlights on Chinese Super League official site 
 Statistics on Chinese Super League official site 
 Statistics on CSLdata.com 

Guangzhou Pharmaceutical Fc Season, 2009
Guangzhou F.C. seasons
Guangzhou Pharmaceutical F.C.